Luther Severance (October 26, 1797 – January 25, 1855) was a United States representative and diplomat from Maine.

Life
He was born in Montague, Massachusetts on October 26, 1797. He moved with his parents to Cazenovia, New York in 1799. He attended the common schools, and learned the printer's trade in Peterboro, New York.

He established the Kennebec Journal in Augusta, Maine in 1825. He was elected a member of the Maine House of Representatives, and served in the Maine State Senate. He was elected as a Whig to the Twenty-eighth and Twenty-ninth Congresses in the United States House of Representatives (March 4, 1843–March 3, 1847).

He was  vice president of the Whig National Convention in 1848. He served as United States commissioner (diplomatic rank similar to that of Ambassador) to the Kingdom of Hawaii 1850 through the end of 1853. He died in Augusta, Maine on January 25, 1855. His interment was in Forest Grove Cemetery.

Family
Severance married Anna Hamlin (May 31, 1801 – April 2, 1887), daughter of Theophilus and Sarah Rockwood Hamlin, on October 12, 1827. They had three children:
Henry Weld Severance (July 12, 1828 – February 11, 1908), who married Hannah Swann Child. He became the Hawaiian Consul for San Francisco.
Anna Severance (April 12, 1831 – June 20, 1912), who married Marshal of the Kingdom of Hawaii William Cooper Parke
Luther Severance (June 1, 1836 – July 8, 1917), who married Lucinda Maria Clark, daughter of Ephraim Weston Clark. He settled in Honolulu and later Hilo where he served as Postmaster of Hilo

References

External links

 

1797 births
1855 deaths
Politicians from Augusta, Maine
People from Montague, Massachusetts
People from Cazenovia, New York
Ambassadors of the United States to Hawaii
Whig Party members of the United States House of Representatives from Maine
19th-century American politicians
People from Peterboro, New York